Garrett Memorial Chapel is a small Church in the Norman Gothic Style located on Bluff Point in the town of Jerusalem, in Yates County, New York. On 30 March 2001 the Chapel was added to the National Register of Historic Places.

The Chapel was built in 1930-1931 by the Garrett family of whom Paul Garrett was a major figure in the American wine industry as a memorial to his son Charles who had died of tuberculosis in January 1930.  The rectangular plan building is constructed of ashlar granite with cast stone decorative elements.  It features a polygonal apse, round arched openings, and a large square corner tower topped by a lantern and weathervane.  On the lower level is the church crypt.  Also on the property is a contributing concrete block lavatory. Many of the stained glass windows in the chapel and the crypt were designed by Frederick Wilson.

The Chapel is normally open from April to November and is serviced by a seasonal access road.  The Chapel is non-denominational but is under the stewardship of the Episcopal Diocese of Rochester.  It is a popular venue for weddings due to its architecture and scenic views of Keuka Lake and the surrounding area.

References

Churches on the National Register of Historic Places in New York (state)
Gothic Revival church buildings in New York (state)
Churches completed in 1931
20th-century Unitarian Universalist church buildings
Churches in Yates County, New York
National Register of Historic Places in Yates County, New York